9 de Julio is a station on Line D of the Buenos Aires Underground.  From here, passengers may transfer to Carlos Pellegrini station on Line B and Diagonal Norte station on Line C and Metrobus 9 de Julio.

The station was opened on 3 June 1937 as part of the inaugural section of Line D, between Catedral and Tribunales.

Gallery

References

External links

Buenos Aires Underground stations
1937 establishments in Argentina